Resor Island is one of the many uninhabited Canadian arctic islands in Qikiqtaaluk Region, Nunavut. It is a Baffin Island offshore island located in Frobisher Bay, southeast of the capital city of Iqaluit. Other islands in the immediate vicinity include Pike Island, Pugh Island, Sliver Island, Wedge Island, and Whiskukun Island.

References

External links
https://geotargit.com/index.php?qcountry_code=CA&qregion_code=14&qcity=Resor+Island

Uninhabited islands of Qikiqtaaluk Region
Islands of Baffin Island
Islands of Frobisher Bay